Ariel Davrieux is a Uruguayan accountant, economist and politician. A man of the Colorado Party, he held the post of Head of the Uruguayan Office of Planning and Budgeting for 15 years, during both presidential terms of Julio María Sanguinetti and that of Jorge Batlle.

References

Uruguayan people of French descent
People from Montevideo
Uruguayan economists
University of the Republic (Uruguay) alumni
Colorado Party (Uruguay) politicians
Directors of the Office of Planning and Budgeting of Uruguay
Living people
Year of birth missing (living people)